The 2014 FIG World Cup circuit in Rhythmic Gymnastics includes one category A event (Stuttgart) and eight category B events. Except for Corbeil-Essones, which is a competition for individuals only, all tournaments feature Individual and Group competitions. The All-around medal event also serves as qualification for the apparatus finals.

With eight stopovers in Europe and one in Asia, the competitions took place on March 14 – 16 in Debrecen (HUN), March 22 – 23 in Stuttgart (GER), April 3 – 6 in Lisbon (POR), April 11 – 13 in Pesaro (ITA), May 9 – 11 in  Corbeil-Essonnes  (FRA), May 22 – 24 in Tashkent (UZB), May 30 – June 1 in Minsk (BLR), August 9 – 10 in Sofia (BUL), and September 5 – 7 in Kazan (RUS).

The world ranking points collected by the competitors at their best four World Cup events added up to a total, and the top scorers in each discipline were crowned winners of the overall series at the final event in Kazan, Russia.

Yana Kudryavtseva became the all-around winner at the last stage of the World Cup Series ahead of teammate Margarita Mamun, who took the all-around silver. Melitina Staniouta of Belarus won the all-around bronze medal. Katsiaryna Halkina of Belarus finished 4th, and Son Yeon-Jae of South Korea, 5th.

Formats

Medal winners

All-around

Individual

Group all-around

Apparatus

Hoop

Ball

Clubs

Ribbon

10 Clubs

3 Balls 2 Ribbons

Overall medal table

See also
 2014 FIG Artistic Gymnastics World Cup series

References

Rhythmic Gymnastics World Cup
2014 in gymnastics